Bhira Hydroelectric Project is an electricity generating complex in Bhira, Maharashtra state, India. It generates power using water from the nearby Mulshi Dam. Bhira lies approximately 150 km from Mumbai. Its construction was completed in 1927.

Specifications
The plant's maximum output capacity is nominally 300 MW, generated by six 25 MW Pelton turbines and a 150 MW pumped storage generator added in 1997. In 2014 two 10 kW microturbine units were added to generate further power from the tailrace after the main turbines.

Awards
In 2007 the Central Electricity Authority (CEA) awarded a Silver Shield to the Bhira facility's operators, Tata Power, as the second best performing power station in the country. The plant received a further Silver Shield in the following year.

Location
Bhira's rural location makes it a leisure destination for Mumbai residents.

Climate
The following climate data is for Bhira village in which the plant is located.

Bhira has a tropical monsoon climate (Am) with little to no rainfall from November to May and extremely heavy rainfall from June to September when it is affected by the Arabian Sea branch of the South-west monsoon with moderately heavy rainfall in October.

References

Hydroelectric power stations in Maharashtra
Pumped-storage hydroelectric power stations in India
1927 establishments in India
Energy infrastructure completed in 1927